Enicostema is a genus of flowering plants belonging to the family Gentianaceae.

Its native range is Ethiopia to Southern Africa and Southern Malesia, Central America, Caribbean to Venezuela.

Species:

Enicostema axillare 
Enicostema elizabethiae 
Enicostema verticillatum

References

Gentianaceae
Gentianaceae genera